Muju Resort (무주리조트), officially Muju Deogyusan Resort (무주덕유산리조트) is a ski resort in Muju, South Korea. Also located in the Deogyu Mountain National Park, it is the only ski resort in South Korea situated in national park.

The resort is one of the largest ski resorts in South Korea. It has the second-highest vertical drop in South Korea after the 2018 Winter Olympic downhill slopes and the highest vertical drop of the commercial resorts.

History 
The resort was opened on December 22, 1990 by Ssangbangwool Group. When it opened, the ski slopes only included the Manseon Peak, the western-half of the current slopes. For the 1997 Winter Universiade, the resort completed the ski jumping hills on September 16, 1996. It subsequently completed the Seolcheon Peak slopes and Nordic ski area together on December 5, 1996.

See also 
 Jumping Park
 1997 Winter Universiade
 List of ski areas and resorts in South Korea

References

External links 
 Official website

Ski areas and resorts in South Korea
1997 Winter Universiade
Sports venues in North Jeolla Province
Muju County